Thomas Blomqvist (born 15 January 1965) is a Finnish politician, born in Ekenäs in current Raseborg. Before entering to the national politics he worked as a farmer and an entrepreneur. 

Blomqvist was elected to the municipal council of Ekenäs in 1993. In 2009 he was elected to the municipal council of Raseborg (to which Ekenäs had joined) and has held his position ever since.  

He was elected to the Finnish Parliament for the Swedish People's Party in 2007, from the constituency of Uusimaa. In 2019 he was re-elected to the parliament for the term 2019–2023. He was appointed Minister for Nordic Cooperation  Antti Rinne's cabinet in 2019. After the collapse of the cabinet in December 2019, Blomqvist continued in the same position in the following Marin Cabinet.

Blomqvist is married and the couple has three children.

Honors 

  Order of the White Rose of Finland (Finland, 2022)
  Order of the Falcon (Iceland, 2022)

References

1965 births
Living people
People from Raseborg
Swedish-speaking Finns
Swedish People's Party of Finland politicians
Government ministers of Finland
Members of the Parliament of Finland (2007–11)
Members of the Parliament of Finland (2011–15)
Members of the Parliament of Finland (2015–19)
Members of the Parliament of Finland (2019–23)